Mahala is a village in Chernivtsi Raion, Chernivtsi Oblast, Ukraine with a predominantly romanian population. It hosts the administration of Mahala rural hromada, one of the hromadas of Ukraine.

Until 18 July 2020, Mahala belonged to Novoselytsia Raion. The raion was abolished in July 2020 as part of the administrative reform of Ukraine, which reduced the number of raions of Chernivtsi Oblast to three. The area of Novoselytsia Raion was split between Chernivtsi and Dnistrovskyi Raions, with Mahala being transferred to Chernivtsi Raion.

History 
Mahala has been part of the Principality of Moldova since its establishment in the historical region of Bukovina. The first historical mention of village of Mahala dated 1472 in the documents of the Moldavian Lord Stephen the Great. The village of Mahala is mentioned in the documents of the Church  Foundation in the XV century. From the same documents it is known as the village of Ostritsa which was donated by Stefan the Great to Monastery of Putna. This village was purchased by the Lord of Moldova for 200 tatar zlotys from Tabuchi from Kobli, his brother Pozhar and their sister Nastasia. In 1514 the son of Stefan the Great Bohdan III One-eyed owed allegiance to a turkish sultan and became turkish protectorate.

In January 1775, as a result of the attitude of neutrality during the military conflict between Turkey and Russia (1768-1774), the Habsburg Empire (present-day Austria) received part of the territory of Moldavia , a territory known as Bucovina. After the annexation of Bukovina the village of Mahala was part of the Duchy of Bukovina , ruled by the Austrians, part of the Sadagura district (in German Sadagora).

After the Union of Bucovina with Romania on November 28, 1918, the village of Mahala became part of Romania. At that time, the population was composed almost entirely of Romanians.

As a result of the Ribbentrop-Molotov Pact (1939), Northern Bukovina was annexed by the USSR on June 28, 1940 (re-entered in Romania as part in 1941-1944) Then, Northern Bukovina was reoccupied again by the USSR in 1944 and integrated into the Ukrainian SSR.

Since 1991, the village of Mahala has been part of the Noua Suliță district of the Chernivtsi region of independent Ukraine. According to the 1989 census, the number of inhabitants who declared themselves Romanians plus Moldovans was 2,231 (16 + 2,215), representing 90.40% of the population.

Hromada of Mahala 
Magal United Territorial Community was formed in October 2017 as a result of the merger of two village councils: Magal village council Ridkivtsi village council.

The following settlements are subordinated to the Mahala village council:

 Magala village (2740 people)
 Ostrytsia village (2432 people)
 Buda village (1470 people)
 Prut village (502 people)

The following settlements are subordinated to Ridkivtsi village council:

 Ridkivtsi village (4503 people)

On the territory of the community there are: 3 schools, 6 kindergartens, 3 outpatient clinic, 2 houses of culture.  As of January 1, 2018 the population of the village is 11 647 people.

Notable people 

 Grigore Nandriș (1895-1968) - Romanian linguist, philologist and memorialist, professor at the universities of Chernivtsi, Krakow, Bucharest, London and Oxford.
 Anița Nandriș (1904-1986) – peasant woman deported to Siberia, who left an extensive diary about the ordeal lived.

References

External links 
 

Villages in Chernivtsi Raion